Cysteine and tyrosine-rich protein 1 is a protein that in humans is encoded by the CYYR1 gene and is located on chromosome 21, location 21q21.2. This protein has a function that is not presently understood.

Protein 

The product of the gene is a single pass type 1 transmembrane protein with four exons and a very large intron of 85.8 kb and coding for a protein containing 154 amino acids. The most prominent feature identified in the protein is a central, unique cysteine and tyrosine-rich protein domain, on portion of the protein which is located inside the cell. This domain is found to be strongly conserved from lower vertebrates (fishes) to humans but is absent in bacteria and invertebrates.

Properties and Domains 
Bioinformatic analysis predicted the following properties for CYYR1:
 Molecular Weight = 16.6kdal
 Isoelectric Point = 8.28
The amino acid sequence is 153 amino acids long and contains 3 domains.
1   MDAPRLPVRP GVLLPKLVLL FVYADDCLAQ CGKDCKSYCC DGTTPYCCSY
51  YAYIGNILSG TAIAGIVFGI VFIMGVIAGI AICICMCMKN HRATRVGILR
101 TTHINTVSSY PGPPPYGHDH EMEYCDLPPP YSPTPQGPAQ RSPPPPYPGN
151 ARK
Using bioinformatic tools the following domains were determined:
 Signal Peptide - Position 1-29
 Transmembrane Domain - Position 62-82
 Poly-Proline Domain - Position 144-149

Orthologs 
Multiple sequence alignments were done with orthologs of the CYYR1 gene and they show that the protein sequence is highly conserved throughout all vertebrates. 

There are no known or predicted paralogs in Homo sapiens.

Interactions 
CYYR1 has been shown to increase glutathione (GSH) level in yeast cells when complementing a defect in GSH uptake in yeast cells that lack Hgt1p, the primary yeast GSH uptake transporter. However, the CYYR1 gene is not naturally found in yeast, so function of CYYR1 is still unknown.

References

Further reading